Rock & Roll Heart Attack is Cindy Valentine's debut album. The nine-year-old Canadian prodigy released Rock & Roll Heart Attack on vinyl with CBS Columbia Records in 1984. Valentine's subsequent work is featured in the title track of the film Repossessed (1990). Mannequin Two: On the Move (1991) features Valentine's single "Pick Up The Pieces (To My Heart)"; her song "Please" appears in the soundtrack of Love in Paris/Another 9½ Weeks (1997). Valentine starred as Shana the Rock Star in Teen Witch (1989), where she co-wrote and performed the songs "Never Gonna Be The Same Again" and "Finest Hour".

Valentine is Italian born and was raised in Canada. She is a classically trained, solo singer, composer, pianist and percussionist who is now a U.S. citizen and works as a composer in the film and television industry.

Background 

Rock And Roll Heart Attack produced three singles: "Victim", "Make It Through the Night" and "Big Kiss". A music video titled Victim, starring Cindy Valentine and Michael Damian was produced to support the album. Rock And Roll Heart Attack was re-released on CD in 2007 on Magada Records.

Musicians 

 Cindy Valentine – lead vocals
 Chris Wade – keyboards
 Rod Mcmanus – keyboards
 Davide Amadei – guitars
 Aubrey Dana – guitars
 Rick Rice – guitars
 Bryan Hughes – guitars
 Greg Steele – drums, percussion
 Asher Fisher – drums, percussion
 Lorne Ould – bass
 Nick Pregino – bass

Track list

References

External links 
 Valentine Productions
 

1984 debut albums
Pop rock albums by Canadian artists
Cindy Valentine albums
Albums produced by Tony Green
CBS Records albums